The 2022–23 season is the 106th season in the existence of Southampton Football Club and the club's eleventh consecutive season in the Premier League. In addition to the league, they also competed in the FA Cup and the EFL Cup.

Current squad

|}

Transfers
Players transferred in

Players loaned in

Players transferred out

Players loaned out

Players released

Pre-season and friendlies
Southampton revealed that a summer training camp would take place in Austria between 13 and 20 July, with a friendly match against Bundesliga side Austria Klagenfurt taking place on 18 July. On 9 June, a home pre-season friendly against Villarreal was confirmed. On 24 June, a further fixture against Watford was added to the team's pre-season schedule. A fourth friendly was announced on 7 July against Monaco at St Mary's Stadium, while a fifth against RB Leipzig was added to the side’s Austrian pre-season tour on 8 July.

Competitions

Overall record

Premier League

League table

Results summary

Results by round

Matches

On 16 June, the Premier League fixtures were released.

FA Cup

The Saints were drawn away to Crystal Palace in the third round and at home to Blackpool in the fourth round. The Saints were drawn at home again in the fifth round, against the winners of the tie between Luton Town and Grimsby Town.

EFL Cup

Southampton entered in the second round of the competition and were drawn away to Cambridge United. In the third round they were drawn at home to Sheffield Wednesday. A fourth round tie against EFL League One side Lincoln City was drawn next for the Saints. In the quarter-finals, Southampton were drawn as host to Manchester City. Over two legs in the semi-finals, Southampton were drawn against Newcastle United.

Squad statistics

Most appearances

Top goalscorers

References

Southampton
Southampton F.C. seasons